Thorne is a municipality in the Pontiac Regional County Municipality, Quebec, Canada, about  northwest of Downtown Gatineau, part of the Outaouais region.

It is named after a town with the same name in Yorkshire, England. The name Thorn(e) is rarely used alone in English toponymy where it is more common in other forms such as Thornhill, Thornton, Thornley, Thornham, Thorngrove.

Geography
Its notable lakes are Barnes, Johnson, Mecham, Sparling, Thorne, and Toote Lakes.

Its settlements include Greer Mount, Hodgins, Ladysmith, Schwartz, Thornby, and Thorne Centre.

History
On May 1, 1861, the Township of Thorne was formed when it separated from Clarendon Township. But because it was too small to form its own municipality, it was merged with Leslie Township. James Martin was its first mayor.

That same year, it had a population between 450 and 465 people, made up of mixed national origin but only fourteen French Canadians. During the next ten years, the area had a large increase of settlers from German descent.

In 1867, Leslie Township separated (now part of Otter Lake) and Thorne was merged with its neighbouring townships to form the United Township Municipality of Thorne-Cawood-et-Alleyn. In 1876, the Cawood and Alleyn townships were separated, resulting in the creation of the Township Municipality of Thorne on January 1, 1877, with John Rennix as mayor.

On August 2, 2003, the statute of the municipality changed and the Township Municipality of Thorne became the Municipality of Thorne.

Demographics

Population

Language
Mother tongues (2021):
 English as first language: 70.8%
 French as first language: 22.6%
 English and French as first language: 3.8%
 Other as first language: 2.8%

See also
 List of municipalities in Quebec

References

External links

Incorporated places in Outaouais
Municipalities in Quebec